Francisc von Neuman Stadium was a multi-purpose stadium in Arad, Romania. It was used mostly for football matches and was the home ground of FC UTA Arad, one of the most successful teams in Romanian club football. The stadium used to hold up to 7,287 people, all on seats, and was built in 1944.

In 2014 the stadium was demolished to make way for a new, modern, exclusively for football, all-seater stadium expected to be open in 2020. The new stadium will have a capacity of 12.700 seats, and will also include offices, a press club, a press center, V.I.P. hospitality, a restaurant and a hotel.

History
The stadium was opened on 1 September 1946 with a match between UTA Arad - Ciocanul București 1–0. At that time, the stadium was considered the most modern in the country. It is named after a local Jewish aristocrat, Francisc von Neumann, a baron who owned several businesses in Arad and who personally sponsored the construction of the stadium and the founding of the team. While studying in England, he became a fan of the London-based football team Arsenal, hence the similar team colours.

In 2006 the stadium went through a major overhaul, when the municipality invested over 700.000 euro for new seats (dropping its capacity from approximately 10.000 on benches), main stand structural repairs, new cloakrooms, an anti-doping control room, an emergency medical room, a VIP sector, new multimedia sector and a new sound system.

In 2008, a 1400 lux density floodlight system was installed as well as a new electronic scoreboard.

In 2010 the municipality presented plans for a new 12.700 capacity all-seater stadium to be built on the exact site of this arena.

Events

Association football

Association football

Gallery

References

Football venues in Romania
Buildings and structures in Arad, Romania
Multi-purpose stadiums in Romania
1946 establishments in Romania
2014 disestablishments in Romania
Sports venues completed in 1946
Sports venues demolished in 2014